As of 2021, Portugal had 1,181,027 immigrants out of 10,300,000 inhabitants, accounting for 11.5% of its total population.

Dealing with foreigners, in 2019 there were some 590,000 people holding foreign citizenship in Portugal. With the COVID-19 pandemic, that number went up to 661,000 at the end of 2020.

In 2007 Portugal had 10,617,575 inhabitants of whom 332,137, or 3.13%, were legal immigrants (51,7% female, 48,3% male). In 2020, Portugal had 662,095 legal residents of foreign origin, of which 336,123 identified as male, and 325,972 as female.

Immigrants to Portugal include Brazilians, Ukrainians, Americans, Moldovans, Romanians, Russians, Asians, and Africans.

Immigration
Portugal, for long a country of emigration, has become a meeting country of net immigration, and not just from the last Portuguese overseas territories in India (until 1961), Africa (until 1975), and Far East Asia (until 1999). Over a million of Portuguese citizens from Portugal's African territories (mostly from Angola and Mozambique) migrated in Portugal during the 1970s. Since the 1990s, along with a boom in construction, several new waves of Ukrainian, Brazilian, people from the former Portuguese colonies in Africa and other Africans have settled in the country. Those communities currently make up the largest groups of immigrants in Portugal. Romanians, Moldovans, Chinese and Indians also have chosen Portugal as a destination. A number of EU citizens have also chosen Portugal as a destination, with a major part of the British, French, Italian, Spanish, Dutch, German, Swedish communities, among others, being mostly composed of persons looking for quality of life, including an increasing number of pensioners.

Immigration to Portugal has grown since the 1990s. Some immigrant communities, like those arrived from Africa and South America, grew as a result of economic emigration - foreigners looking for better economic conditions abroad. Other immigrant communities, like most of those arrived from other EU member states, are a result of the attractiveness of the country for high income foreign citizens looking for a better quality of life, a warmer sunny weather, security and exquisite cuisine.

However, despite Portugal's reputation as an economic success story since the financial crisis, many young, educated workers are still more attracted by significantly higher wages in European countries such as Germany, Britain or Switzerland. Nearly 600,000 people emigrated during years of austerity between 2011 and 2015. As a measure to revert skill-drain, population decrease and ageing, the government has since created new measures to attract Portuguese emigrants to return home.

Resident foreigners

Many earlier immigrants have now become naturalized citizens: 264,951 people from 2008 to 2019, corresponding roughly to 2.6% of total population.

In addition, there are still some 662,095 foreign citizens resident in Portugal as of 2020, accounting for 6.4% of Portugal population.

Brazilians are the most prevalent foreign nationality. The 183,993 resident Brazilians are 1.78% of the total population. Other significant foreign communities (excluding naturalized citizens) are the ones from other countries of the Lusosphere. In 2020 there were 95,459 from PALOP countries (Equatorial Guinea, Guinea-Bissau, São Tomé and Principe, Angola, Mozambique, Cape Verde) as well as from Timor-Leste and Macau, corresponding to 0.92% of the whole population.

The number of foreigners from Ukraine (28,629), Romania (30,052), Moldova (5,183) and Bulgaria (6,745) has been dropping steadily since 2011; there have been many naturalized Portuguese citizens with these backgrounds; respectively: 27,211 Ukrainians, 5,680 Romanians, 18,335 Moldovans and 936 Bulgarians have become Portuguese citizens from 2008 to 2019.

In addition, there is a thriving community of people from the Indian subcontinent (chiefly Indians and Nepalis) adding up to 61,978 people or 0.6% of total population.

In recent years, many Britons, Italians, French, Germans, Spanish and Dutch have established themselves in Portugal.

Illegal immigration 

In 2006 the Portuguese government made it easier for second generation immigrants to gain citizenship in order to prevent illegal immigration. There are now estimated to be 260,000 immigrants from Russia, Ukraine, and Moldova in Portugal, half of these illegal. Many work in agriculture and services.

Illegal immigration rose by 55% in 2009, with most of the illegals being Brazilian nationals. Employers of illegal immigrants in Portugal face jail terms.

Jewish immigration

In recent years, several hundred Turkish Jews, who have been able to prove that they are descended from Jews expelled from Portugal in 1497, have acquired Portuguese citizenship.

Immigration by Investment
Another group of immigrants, especially among Non-European citizens, can avail the chance of residing in Portugal by making a financial investment. RBI (Residency by Investment) schemes, also called “golden visa” or “golden passport”, offer Non-European citizens a residency and work permit inside Europe. According to RBI programs operated by a handful of Member States of EU, Non-European citizens can have access to residency or citizenship in exchange for specified investments in the country.

Under Portugal's Golden Visa program, which has been in service since 8 October 2012, the Portuguese government grants a residence permit to those who invest an amount of at least €350,000 which is maintained for at least (a continuous) five years.

See also
 Access to healthcare for migrants in Portugal
 Demographics of Portugal
 Portuguese diaspora (emigration from Portugal)
 Immigration to Europe
 List of countries by immigrant population
 List of countries by foreign-born population
 List of sovereign states and dependent territories by fertility rate

References

 
Society of Portugal